The bourdon is the heaviest of the bells that belong to a musical instrument, especially a chime or a carillon, and produces its lowest tone.

As an example, the largest bell of a carillon of 64 bells, the sixth largest bell hanging in the world, in the Southern Illinois town of Centralia, is identified as the 'bourdon.' It weighs  and is tuned to G. In the Netherlands where carillons are native, the heaviest carillon is in Grote Kerk in Dordrecht (South Holland).

The biggest bell serving as bourdon of any carillon is the low C bell at Riverside Church, New York City.

The bourdon at St. Paul’s Cathedral in London, called Great Paul, weighs 16.7 tonnes. It is the largest bell ever cast in the British Isles. Great Paul is the second heaviest bell in the United Kingdom after the 25.7-tonne Olympic Bell, cast in the Netherlands for the 2012 London Games. As it is not a part of a harmonically-tuned set, the Olympic Bell is not considered a bourdon.

Although carillons are by definition chromatic, the next bell up from the bourdon is traditionally a whole tone higher in pitch, leaving a semitone out of the instrument. Bells separated from the next higher note by more than two semitones (one whole tone) are called sub-bourdons.

English-style ring of bells
The heaviest bell in a diatonically tuned English-style ring of bells (change ringing) is called the tenor. If a larger, heavier bell is also present it would be called a bourdon.

See also
 Campanology
 Carillon
 Pieter and François Hemony

References

Bells (percussion)
Carillons